80th NBR Awards
January 14, 2009

Best Film: 
 Slumdog Millionaire 
The 80th National Board of Review Awards, honoring the best in film for 2008, were given on 12 January 2009.

Top 10 Films 
Slumdog Millionaire
Burn After Reading
Changeling
The Curious Case of Benjamin Button
The Dark Knight
Defiance
Frost/Nixon
Gran Torino
Milk
WALL-E
The Wrestler

Top Foreign Films
The Edge of Heaven (Auf der anderen Seite)
Let the Right One In (Låt den rätte komma in)
Roman de Gare
A Secret
Waltz with Bashir

Top Five Documentaries
American Teen
The Betrayal
Dear Zachary: A Letter to a Son About His Father
Encounters at the End of the World
Roman Polanski: Wanted and Desired

Top Independent Films
Frozen River
In Bruges
In Search of a Midnight Kiss
Hallam Foe
Rachel Getting Married
Snow Angels
Son of Rambow
Vicky Cristina Barcelona
The Visitor
Wendy and Lucy

Winners
Best Film: 
Slumdog Millionaire (Academy Award for Best Picture)
Best Foreign Language Film: 
Mongol, Mongolia
Best Animated Feature:
Wall-E
Best Documentary Feature: 
Man on Wire
Best Actor: 
Clint Eastwood - Gran Torino
Best Actress: 
Anne Hathaway - Rachel Getting Married
Best Supporting Actor: 
Josh Brolin - Milk
Best Supporting Actress: 
Penélope Cruz - Vicky Cristina Barcelona
Breakthrough Male Performances: 
Dev Patel - Slumdog Millionaire
Breakthrough Female Performances:
Viola Davis - Doubt
Best Cast: 
Doubt
Best Director: 
David Fincher - The Curious Case of Benjamin Button
Best Directorial Debut:
Courtney Hunt - Frozen River
Best Screenplay - Adapted (tie):
Slumdog Millionaire - Simon Beaufoy
The Curious Case of Benjamin Button - Eric Roth
Best Screenplay - Original: 
Gran Torino - Nick Schenk
Freedom of Expression Award:
Trumbo
Spotlight Award: 
Melissa Leo and Richard Jenkins
William K. Everson Award for Film History:
Molly Haskell and Andrew Sarris

Notes

2008
2008 film awards
2008 in American cinema